Johny I Love You is a 1982 Indian Hindi romance drama film directed by Rakesh Kumar. The movie stars Sanjay Dutt, Rati Agnihotri, Amrish Puri and Suresh Oberoi in lead roles.

Plot 
Suraj Singh leaves his past life and lives in a remote hill town after the death of his wife. His only son Johny is unaware about father's past but Suraj Singh's ex-partner, present enemy Zalim Khan comes there years later. Johny has to confront Zalim Khan to find the truth about his parents.

Cast 
 Sanjay Dutt as Raju Singh / Johny
 Rati Agnihotri as Seema
 Tanuja as Meera
 Suresh Oberoi as Suraj Singh
 Amrish Puri as Zalim Khan
 Om Prakash as Colonel
 Aruna Irani as Seductress

Soundtrack
Lyrics: Anand Bakshi

References

External links
 

1982 films
1980s Hindi-language films
Films scored by Rajesh Roshan
Indian romantic drama films